The Pasban-e-Pakistan  (  Defenders of Pakistan) also known as Pasban Democratic Party is a political party in Pakistan. It raises its voice against issues of injustice in society. Pasban's current president and founder is Altaf Shakoor.

History
Pasban was initially a youth wing of Jamaat-e-Islami in Pakistan. In 1995, Pasban split from Jaamat-e-Islami and was founded by Altaf Shakoor as a separate splinter group. It registered itself as a political party in 2013. Now it is an independent organisation working for human rights and highlights the problems faced by the common men.

References

External links

Political organisations based in Pakistan
Jamaat-e-Islami Pakistan